Hechuan Road is an underground station on Shanghai Metro Line 9. It began operation on December 29, 2007.  It is located at the corner of Yishan Road and Hechuan Road.

References

Railway stations in Shanghai
Line 9, Shanghai Metro
Railway stations in China opened in 2007
Shanghai Metro stations in Minhang District